An air force academy or air academy is a national institution that provides initial officer training, possibly including undergraduate level education, to air force officer cadets who are preparing to be commissioned officers in a national air force.  The world's first air academy was the RAF (Cadet) College (now called the Royal Air Force College) which was founded on 1 November 1919 on the site of a Royal Navy flying training station.

Many nations support air academies, some of which are:

The Air Force Academy, Finnish Air Force in Jyväskylä, Finland
The Republic of China Air Force Academy of Taiwan, founded in 1928
The Accademia Aeronautica of Italy, founded in 1923
The Brazilian Air Force Academy (Academia da Força Aérea), founded in 1960
The Bangladesh Air Force Academy, founded in 1974 as BAF Cadets’ Training Unit
The Royal Danish Air Force Officers School, founded in 1951
The École de l'air of France
The Air Force Academy of India
The Indonesian Air Force Academy, founded in 1945 
The Egyptian Air Academy, founded in 1951
The Gagarin Air Force Academy, Russian Air Force, founded in 1940
The Hellenic Air Force Academy of Greece, founded in 1919 as the Military Academy of Aviation, became the Air Force School in 1931 
The Korea Air Force Academy, founded as the Aviation Academy in 1949
The Norwegian Air Force Academy, founded in 1949
The Pakistan Air Force Academy, founded as a flying training school in 1947 and became a college in 1948, redesignated as an academy in 1967
The Polish Air Force Academy, founded in 1927
The Portuguese Air Force Academy (Academia da Força Aérea), founded in 1978
The Sri Lanka Air Force Academy, founded in 1976
The Turkish Air Force Academy, founded in 1951
The Royal Air Force College Cranwell of the United Kingdom, founded in 1916 as a naval air training base, became an air force college in 1919
The United States Air Force Academy, founded in 1954
The Zhukovsky Air Force Engineering Academy, Russian Air Force, founded in 1920
The Zhukovsky – Gagarin Air Force Academy, Russian Air Force, amalgamation of the Zhukovsky Air Force Engineering Academy and Gagarin Air Force Academy in 2008
The Israeli Air Force flight academy trains aircrew to operate Israeli Air Force aircraft, qualifying fighter, helicopter and transport pilots as well as combat and transport navigators.

See also 

 
 Naval academy

References

 *